Facelina annulicornis is a species of sea slugs, an aeolid nudibranch, a marine gastropod mollusc in the family Facelinidae.

Distribution
This species has been reported from County Donegal, Ireland south to Portugal and the Mediterranean Sea.

Ecology
Facelina annulicornis is a predator of the hydroid Halecium halecium and probably other hydroids and possibly other aeolid nudibranchs.

References

Molluscs of Europe
Fauna of Ireland
Taxa named by Adelbert von Chamisso
Facelinidae
Gastropods described in 1821